This is a list of Robbie Williams' studio recordings during his time as a solo artist. More details on scarce tracks are given later in the article. Tracks highlighted blue have only appeared on other artists' or compilation albums; rather than Williams' own albums or releases. 61 of the 299 songs listed here are cover versions of songs previously performed by other artists. For details of songs recorded by Williams as a member of Take That, see List of Take That songs.



Songs list

Scarce tracks

Although Williams has led an extremely public solo career, certain recordings remain scarce, mainly due to their unavailability as a digital download, or international unavailability.

Unreleased
Many tracks recorded by Williams have never been commercially released. Some of these unreleased songs that have leaked as demos are listed here:
 Go Now Recorded in 1995 after Robbie left Take That, played on Radio Rudebox in 2013
 Disco Delilah

References

Sources

 Life thru a Lens 
 I've Been Expecting You 
 Sing When You're Winning 
 Swing When You're Winning 
 Escapology 
 Intensive Care 
 Rudebox 
 Reality Killed the Video Star 
 Take the Crown 
 The Ego Has Landed 
 Greatest Hits 
 The Best So Far 
 Songbook 
 In and Out of Consciousness: Greatest Hits 1990–2010
 "Old Before I Die"
 "Lazy Days"
 "South of the Border"
 "Angels"
 "Let Me Entertain You"
 "Millennium"
 "No Regrets"
 "Strong"
 "She's the One" / "It's Only Us"
 "Win Some Lose Some"
 "Rock DJ"
 "Kids"
 "Supreme"
 "Let Love Be Your Energy"
 "Eternity" / "The Road To Mandalay"
 "Better Man"
 "Somethin' Stupid"
 "Mr. Bojangles" / "I Will Talk and Hollywood Will Listen"
 "Feel"
 "Come Undone"
 "Something Beautiful"
 "Sexed Up"
 "Radio" 
 "Misunderstood"
 "Tripping"
 "Make Me Pure"
 "Advertising Space"
 "Sin Sin Sin"
 "Rudebox"
 "Lovelight"
 "She's Madonna"
 "Bongo Bong and Je Ne T'aime Plus"
 "Bodies"
 "You Know Me"
 "Morning Sun"
 "Shame"
 "Candy"
 "Different"
 "Be a Boy"
 "Freedom"
 "United"
 "My Culture"
 "Close My Eyes"
 "He Ain't Heavy, He's My Brother"
 "Be a Boy"
 "Swings Both Ways"
 "The Heavy Entertainment Show"
 " Love My Life"
 "Party Like a Russian"
 "Under the Radar Volume 2"

 
Williams, Robbie
Robbie Williams